Frank McDermott may refer to:

 Frank X. McDermott (1924–2011), American politician in the New Jersey Legislature
 Frank McDermott (American football) (1895–?), American college football player and coach

See also
Frank MacDermot (1886–1975), Irish barrister, soldier, politician, and historian